Dimitri Mitropoulos (– 2 November 1960) was a Greek conductor, pianist, and composer.

Life and career 

Mitropoulos was born in Athens, the son of Yannis and Angelikē Mitropoulos. His father owned a leather goods shop in downtown Athens.  He was musically precocious, demonstrating his abilities at an early age. From the ages of eleven to fourteen, when Mitropoulos was in secondary school, he would host and preside over informal musical gatherings at his house every Saturday afternoon. His earliest acknowledged composition – a sonata for violin and piano, now lost – dates from this period. His opera Soeur Béatrice, based on the play by Maurice Maeterlinck, premiered in 1919.

He studied music at the Athens Conservatoire as well as in Brussels and Berlin, with Ferruccio Busoni among his teachers. In 1921 he conducted the inaugural music of the Bavarian Socialist Republic. From 1921 to 1925 he assisted Erich Kleiber at the Berlin State Opera and then took a number of posts in Greece. At a 1930 concert with the Berlin Philharmonic, finding that his soloist was sick he played the solo part of Prokofiev's Piano Concerto No. 3 and conducted the orchestra from the keyboard, becoming one of the first to do so.

United States 
Mitropoulos made his U.S. debut in 1936 with the Boston Symphony Orchestra, and he later settled in the country, becoming a citizen in 1946. From 1937 to 1949 he served as principal conductor of the Minneapolis Symphony Orchestra (forerunner of today's Minnesota Orchestra).

In 1949 Mitropoulos began his association with the New York Philharmonic. He was initially co-conductor with Leopold Stokowski and became the sole music director in 1951. Mitropoulos recorded extensively with the Philharmonic for Columbia Records and sought to reach new audiences in the city through appearances on television and by conducting a week of performances at the Roxy Theatre, a popular movie theatre. Mitropoulos expanded the Philharmonic's repertoire, commissioning works by new composers and championing the symphonies of Gustav Mahler. In 1958, he was succeeded as the Philharmonic's conductor by a protégé, Leonard Bernstein. In January 1960, he guest conducted the Philharmonic in a performance of Mahler's Fifth Symphony, which was recorded.

Work in opera 
In addition to his orchestral career, Mitropoulos conducted opera extensively in Italy, and from 1954 until his death in 1960 was the principal conductor of the Metropolitan Opera in New York, although the Met never had an official 'principal conductor' title until the 1970s. His musically incisive and dramatically vivid performances of Puccini, Verdi, Richard Strauss and others remain models of the opera conductor's art. The Met's extensive archive of recorded broadcasts preserves many of these fine performances.

Mitropoulos's series of recordings for Columbia Records with the New York Philharmonic included a rare complete performance of Alban Berg's Wozzeck. Many of these have been reissued by Sony Classics on CD, including most recently his stereo recordings of excerpts from Prokofiev's Romeo and Juliet. He recorded with the Minneapolis Symphony for RCA Victor during the 78-rpm era.  He was also represented on the Cetra Records label, most notably with an early recording of Richard Strauss's Elektra.

Mitropoulos premiered many contemporary works. Examples include the American premieres of Shostakovich's Tenth Symphony (1954) and First Violin Concerto (1956) and the world premieres of Barber's Vanessa (1958), Ernst Krenek's Fourth Symphony (1947), and John J. Becker's Short Symphony (1950).

Personal life
Mitropoulos was noted for having an eidetic memory (which enabled him to conduct without a score, even during rehearsals) and for his monk-like life style due to his deeply religious, Greek Orthodox beliefs.

Mitropoulos was "quietly known to be homosexual" and "felt no need for a cosmetic marriage".  Among his relationships reportedly was one with a young Leonard Bernstein.

Mitropoulos died in Milan, Italy at the age of 64 of heart failure, while rehearsing Mahler's 3rd Symphony at the La Scala Opera House. One of his last recorded performances was Verdi's La forza del destino with Giuseppe Di Stefano, Antonietta Stella and Ettore Bastianini in Vienna on 23 September 1960. A recording exists of the performance of Mahler's 3rd Symphony given by Mitropoulos with the Cologne Radio Symphony on 31 October 1960, just two days before his death.

References 

Arfanis, Stathis A. The Complete Discography of Dimitri Mitropoulos. Athens: Irinna S.A., 1990. .
Mitropoulos, Dimitri, and Katsoyanis, Katy: A Correspondence, 1930–1960. New York: Martin Dale, 1973. Introductions by Louis Biancolli and Katy Katsoyanis. LC Number 73075338.
Trotter, William R.  Priest of Music: The Life of Dimitri Mitropoulos. Portland, Oregon: Amadeus Press, 1995.  .
 
 Alessandro Zignani, Dimitri Mitropoulos. Una luce che incatena il cielo, 2008, Zecchini Editore, pagg. 240 con discografia,

Resources 
 Finding aid to the Oliver Daniel research collection on Dimitri Mitropoulos at the University of Pennsylvania Libraries
 Dimitri Mitropoulos (Stanford University)

1896 births
1960 deaths
Burials at the First Cemetery of Athens
Conductors of the Metropolitan Opera
Conductors (music) who died while conducting
Greek classical composers
Greek classical musicians
Greek classical pianists
Greek conductors (music)
Greek emigrants to the United States
Greek National School
LGBT classical musicians
LGBT classical composers
LGBT Eastern Orthodox Christians
Greek gay musicians
Musicians from Athens
Gay composers
Music directors of the New York Philharmonic
20th-century conductors (music)
20th-century classical composers
20th-century classical pianists
19th-century Greek Americans
20th-century Greek Americans
19th-century Greek musicians
20th-century Greek musicians